Ch'iyar Jaqhi (Aymara ch'iyara black, jaqhi precipice, cliff, "black cliff", Hispanicized spelling Chearaje) is a mountain in the Peruvian Andes, about  high. It is located in the Puno Region, Azángaro Province, on the border of the districts Potoni and San Antón. Ch'iyar Jaqhi lies northwest of the mountain Uqi Apachita and east of Ichhu Muruq'u.

References

Mountains of Puno Region
Mountains of Peru